Aslinn Enei Rodas De León (born June 10, 1992) is a professional footballer who plays as a midfielder for Liga Nacional club Xelajú. Born in the United States, he represents the Guatemala national team.

Career

Amateur 

In college, Rodas played for Cleveland State University's college soccer team, where he was a starter all four years of college. In his freshman year, he was the All-Horizon League Newcomer Team and had three goals and two assists in his freshman year. His sophomore year saw Rodas be part of the Second Team All-Horizon, while his upperclassmen years saw him get First Team honors.

Professional 

Rodas went undrafted in the 2014 MLS SuperDraft and opted to sign for Guatemalan outfit Club Xelaju. Rodas became a regular start for Chivos and made 17 starts in 18 appearances and scored one goal.

References 

1992 births
Living people
Guatemalan footballers
Guatemala international footballers
Cleveland State Vikings men's soccer players
Xelajú MC players
Association football midfielders
Soccer players from California
Comunicaciones F.C. players
Deportivo Sanarate F.C. players
Sportspeople from San Rafael, California